Winterville is a census-designated place and unincorporated community located in Washington County, Mississippi, near Mississippi Highway 1.

The Winterville site, a National Historic Landmark featuring more than twelve major earthwork mounds from the period of 11th to 15th centuries, is located near Winterville along Mississippi 1. It is the type site of the Plaquemine Mississippian culture, from which the Natchez Indians descended. Preceding cultures also constructed mounds in this area.

It was first named as a CDP in the 2020 Census which listed a population of 96.

Demographics

2020 census

Note: the US Census treats Hispanic/Latino as an ethnic category. This table excludes Latinos from the racial categories and assigns them to a separate category. Hispanics/Latinos can be of any race.

Education
It is in the Western Line School District.

References

Unincorporated communities in Washington County, Mississippi
Unincorporated communities in Mississippi
Census-designated places in Washington County, Mississippi